Far from Vietnam is a 1967 French documentary film directed by Joris Ivens, William Klein, Claude Lelouch, Agnès Varda, Jean-Luc Godard, Chris Marker and Alain Resnais.

Cast
 Anne Bellec
 Karen Blanguernon
 Bernard Fresson as Claude Ridder
 Maurice Garrel
 Jean-Luc Godard as himself
 Ho Chi Minh as himself (archive footage)
 Valérie Mayoux
 Marie-France Mignal
 Fidel Castro as himself (uncredited)

References

External links

1967 films
1967 documentary films
1960s French-language films
French documentary films
Documentary films about the Vietnam War
Anti-war films about the Vietnam War
French war films
Films directed by Joris Ivens
Films directed by Chris Marker
Films directed by Jean-Luc Godard
French anthology films
Films directed by William Klein
Opposition to United States involvement in the Vietnam War
1960s French films
Foreign films set in the United States